Viale della canzone is a 1965 Italian "musicarello" film directed and written by Tullio Piacentini.

Cast
Marisa Solinas
Bobby Solo
Roby Ferrante
Edoardo Vianello
Peppino Di Capri
Los Marcellos Ferial
Ricky Gianco
Sacha Distel
Roberto Murolo
Pino Donaggio
Marino Marini
Nico Fidenco
Mario Zelinotti
Nicola Di Bari
Jimmy Fontana
Vanna Brosio

External links
 

1965 films
1960s Italian-language films
1965 musical films
Italian musical films
1960s Italian films
Musicarelli